WVST-FM is a Variety formatted broadcast radio station licensed to Petersburg, Virginia, serving Metro Petersburg.  WVST-FM is owned and operated by Virginia State University.

References

External links
 The Source 91.3 WVST Online
 

VST-FM
VST-FM
Radio stations established in 1987
Variety radio stations in the United States
1987 establishments in Virginia
Virginia State University